In the context of risk measurement, a risk metric is the concept quantified by a risk measure.  When choosing a risk metric, an agent is picking an aspect of perceived risk to investigate, such as volatility or probability of default.

Risk measure and risk metric 
In a general sense, a measure is a procedure for quantifying something. A metric is that which is being quantified.  In other words, the method or formula to calculate a risk metric is called a risk measure.

For example, in finance, the volatility of a stock might be calculated in any one of the three following ways:

 Calculate the sample standard deviation of the stock's returns over the past 30 trading days.
 Calculate the sample standard deviation of the stock's returns over the past 100 trading days.
 Calculate the implied volatility of the stock from some specified call option on the stock.

These are three distinct risk measures. Each could be used to measure the single risk metric volatility.

Examples 
 Deaths per passenger mile (transportation)
 Probability of failure (systems reliability)
 Volatility (finance)
 Delta (finance)
 Value at risk (finance/actuarial)
 Probability of default (finance/actuarial)

See also 
 Risk measure
 Coherent risk measure
 Deviation risk measure
 Spectral risk measure
 Distortion risk measure

References 

Risk analysis
Financial risk